The 2005–06 National Division One was the 19th full season of rugby union within the second tier of the English league system, currently known as the RFU Championship. New teams to the division included Harlequins who had been relegated from the 2004–05 Zurich Premiership, while Doncaster and Newbury were promoted from the 2004–05 National Division Two.  Additional changes saw Penzance & Newyln RFC rebrand themselves as the Cornish Pirates as well as moving from their home ground, the Mennaye Field in Penzance, to a more central location in Truro at the Kenwyn Rugby Ground (a temporary stadium built in the city) with the aim to appeal more to Cornish fans on the whole as well as making home games more accessible.  Rotherham Titans also rebranded themselves as 'Earth Titans' for sponsorship purposes for this season.

After only one season Harlequins won the National Division One at the first attempt and returned to the Guinness Premiership for season 2006–07. Bedford Blues finished in second place and there was no relegation to National Division Two following the RFU's decision to expand National Division One from 14 to 16 teams for the 2006–07 season.

Participating teams

Table
 

Notes
 Coventry were docked two points for an administrative error when re–registering a player, Dave Millard. Following a foot injury, the winger was loaned to junior club Kenilworth while he was recovering. He returned before the game against Bedford on 27 December 2005 where he was named among the seven replacements. There was an error in the paperwork submitted to the RFU, and although Millard was not used, Coventry were found guilty.
 Statement by First Division Rugby regarding Newbury versus Birmingham & Solihull
Newbury have been awarded a 0–0 win and 4 league points following their match against Pertemps Bees on 22 April.
Pertemps Bees won the match by 35 pts to 22 pts but due to a severe injury crisis had to field three unregistered players with the prior approval of FDR in order to fulfil the fixture. All points gained by either side in the match will be disregarded for the purpose of the official league table in accordance with the RFU Regulations.

Results

Round 1

Round 2

Round 3

Round 4

Round 5

Round 6

Round 7

Round 8

Round 9 

Postponed.  Game rescheduled to 17 December 2005.

Round 10

Round 11

Round 12

Round 9 (rescheduled game)

Round 13

Round 14 

Postponed.  Game rescheduled to 4 February 2006.

Round 15

Round 16

Round 17

Round 14 (rescheduled game)

Round 18

Round 19

Round 20 

Postponed.  Game rescheduled to 4 March 2006.

Postponed.  Game rescheduled to 5 March 2006.

Round 20 (rescheduled games)

Round 21

Round 22

Round 23

Round 25 (rescheduled game) 

Game brought forward from 15 April 2006.

Round 24

Round 25 

Rescheduled.  Game brought forward to 8 April 2006.

Newbury were awarded a 0–0 win and 4 league points following this match.  Pertemps Bees won the match by 35 pts to 22 pts but due to a severe injury crisis had to field three unregistered players with the prior approval of FDR in order to fulfil the fixture. All points gained by either side in the match will be disregarded for the purpose of the official league table in accordance with the RFU Regulations.

Round 26

Season attendances

Leading scorers
 Note that points scorers includes tries as well as conversions, penalties and drop goals.

Top points scorers

Top try scorers

Season records

Team
Largest home win — 65 pts 
70 - 5 Harlequins at home to Exeter Chiefs on 22 October 2005
Largest away win — 52 pts
68 - 16 Bedford Blues away to Pertemps Bees on 11 March 2006
Most points scored — 79 pts
79 - 22 Bedford Blues at home to Newbury on 29 April 2006
Most tries in a match — 12 (x2)
Harlequins at home to Exeter Chiefs on 22 October 2005
Bedford Blues at home to Newbury on 29 April 2006
Most conversions in a match — 9
Bedford Blues at home to Newbury on 29 April 2006
Most penalties in a match — 7
Coventry at home to Newbury on 11 March 2006
Most drop goals in a match — 2
Plymouth Albion at home to Exeter Chiefs on 3 September 2005

Player
Most points in a match — 34
 Alastair Hepher for Bedford Blues at home to Newbury on 29 April 2006
Most tries in a match — 5 (x2)
 Richard Welding for Cornish Pirates at home to Earth Titans on 18 September 2005
 Ugo Monye for Harlequins at home to Exeter Chiefs on 22 October 2005
Most conversions in a match — 9
 Alastair Hepher for Bedford Blues at home to Newbury on 29 April 2006
Most penalties in a match —  7
 James Moore for Coventry at home to Newbury on 11 March 2006
Most drop goals in a match —  1
N/A - multiple players

Attendances

Highest — 12,500 
Harlequins at home to Plymouth Albion on 29 April 2006
Lowest — 325 
Sedgley Park at home to Newbury on 18 February 2006
Highest Average Attendance — 8,996
Harlequins
Lowest Average Attendance — 549 	
Orrell

See also
 English rugby union system

References

External links
 national1.co.uk

2005–06 in English rugby union leagues
2005–06